Qeshlaq-e Hajji Qujakhan (also Romanized as Qeshlāq-e Ḩājjī Qūjākhān) is a village in Qeshlaq-e Shomali Rural District, in the Central District of Parsabad County, Ardabil Province, Iran. At the 2006 census, its population was 16, in 4 families.

References 

Towns and villages in Parsabad County